The 2014 Sparta Prague Open was a professional tennis tournament played on outdoor clay courts. It was the fifth edition of the tournament and part of the 2014 ITF Women's Circuit, offering a total of $100,000+H in prize money. It took place in Prague, Czech Republic, from 12 to 18 May 2014.

Singles main draw entrants

Seeds 

 1 Rankings as of 5 May 2014

Other entrants 
The following players received wildcards into the singles main draw:
  Simona Heinová
  Kateřina Siniaková
  Tereza Smitková
  Petra Uberalová

The following players received entry from the qualifying draw:
  Ekaterina Alexandrova
  Madison Brengle
  Victoria Duval
  Ksenia Pervak

The following player received entry by a special exempt:
  Aleksandra Krunić

Champions

Singles 

  Heather Watson def.  Anna Karolína Schmiedlová 7–6(7–5), 6–0

Doubles 

  Lucie Hradecká /  Michaëlla Krajicek def.  Andrea Hlaváčková /  Lucie Šafářová 6–3, 6–2

External links 
 2014 Sparta Prague Open at ITFtennis.com
 

2014 ITF Women's Circuit
2014
2014
2014
2014 in Czech tennis